Mézin is a commune in the Lot-et-Garonne department in Nouvelle-Aquitaine, south-western France. It is part of the arrondissement of Nerac.

Geography
The Auzoue flows into the Gélise in the commune. The Gélise forms most of the commune's western border.

Demography

See also
Communes of the Lot-et-Garonne department

References

Communes of Lot-et-Garonne